Fishersburg is an unincorporated community in Stony Creek Township, Madison County, Indiana.

History
Fishersburg was laid out in 1837. Charles Fisher started the first store.

A post office was established in Fishersburg in  1837 and was closed in 1904.

Geography
Fishersburg is located in the center of the state, just west of the larger town of Lapel at the intersection of Indiana State Roads 32 and 13. It lies on the border with Hamilton County.

References

Unincorporated communities in Madison County, Indiana
Unincorporated communities in Indiana
Indianapolis metropolitan area